Kindler is a surname. Notable people with the surname include:

Andy Kindler (born 1956), American stand-up comedian
Damian Kindler (born 1968), Australian-born Canadian writer and producer
Hans Kindler (1892–1949), American cellist and conductor
Jeff Kindler, the CEO of the Pfizer corporation
Sven-Christian Kindler (born 1985), German politician

See also
Kindler syndrome, rare congenital disease of the skin caused by a mutation in the KIND1 gene
Kindler v. Canada (Minister of Justice), landmark decision of the Supreme Court of Canada

German-language surnames